Alexander Sergeyevich Aksyonenko sometimes transliterated Aksenenko (born March 8, 1986) is a Russian professional ice hockey defenceman. He currently plays for Metallurg Novokuznetsk of the Kontinental Hockey League (KHL).

He made his Kontinental Hockey League (KHL) debut playing with Amur Khabarovsk during the 2008–09 KHL season.

References

External links

1986 births
Living people
Amur Khabarovsk players
Avtomobilist Yekaterinburg players
HC Sibir Novosibirsk players
Metallurg Novokuznetsk players
People from Elektrostal
Russian ice hockey defencemen
St. Louis Blues draft picks
Eighth convocation members of the State Duma (Russian Federation)
A Just Russia politicians